Miroslav Jančich (born 14 July 1968) is a Slovak water polo player. He competed in the men's tournament at the 1992 Summer Olympics.

References

1968 births
Living people
Slovak male water polo players
Olympic water polo players of Czechoslovakia
Water polo players at the 1992 Summer Olympics
Sportspeople from Bojnice